Chambers Creek is a stream in Ellis County, Texas.  It is a tributary to Richland Creek. Chambers Creek has the name of Thomas Jefferson Chambers, a pioneer settler.

See also
 List of rivers of Texas

References

External links

USGS Geographic Names Information Service
USGS Hydrologic Unit Map - State of Texas (1974)

Landforms of Navarro County, Texas
Landforms of Ellis County, Texas
Rivers of Texas